Amara Raja Group, is an Indian multinational conglomerate company, headquartered in Tirupati, India. The group has a presence in the automotive battery business, packaged foods and beverages, electronics products manufacturing, infrastructure sector, power system production and fabrication of sheet metal products and fasteners. The Amara Raja Group is known for its automotive battery brand Amaron, the second largest selling automotive battery brand in India after Exide Industries.

Amara Raja Group employs a workforce of more than 15,216 employees. Amara Raja Batteries was named on Asia's 'Best Under A Billion' 2010 list of companies compiled by Forbes magazine.

History 
A first generation entrepreneur, Ramachandra Naidu Galla, founded the Amara Raja Group of companies in 1985 and became the first CEO. The automotive batteries business unit commenced operations in 2001 with a joint technology venture with Johnson Controls Inc., the world's largest manufacturer of automotive batteries. It pioneered the introduction of zero maintenance technology in India's automotive battery segment, the key differentiator in the Indian electric storage market.

The group was named after Jaydev's grandparents Amaravati and Rajagopal Naidu.

Early years 
 1985 Power systems Ltd founded
 1989 Industrial battery division (IBD) ISBU
 1992 Designed and Implemented battery manufacturing facility in India
 1997 Received ISO 9001 Certification & signed JV with Johnson Controls
 1998 Automotive battery division (ABD) ASBU
 1999 Received QS9000 Certification
 2008 Small battery division (SBD) Two wheeler battery plant ASBU
 2012 MVRLA (ISBU) UPS Battery
 2013 ARGC Amararaja Growth Corridor 
 2014 Automotive Battery division (ABD-2)
 2015 Tubular battery division (TBD)
 2019 Bipolar battery division

Joint ventures

Johnson Controls Inc. 
 Amara Raja Batteries of India signed a joint venture with Johnson Controls Inc. in December 1997 to manufacture Amaron automotive batteries in India.
 The group terminated their partnership with Johnson Controls on 1 April 2019.

Amara Raja Group of companies 
 Amara Raja Batteries Ltd
 Amara Raja Electronics Ltd
 Amara Raja Power Systems Ltd
 Amara Raja Infra (P) Ltd
 Mangal Industries Ltd
 Amara Raja Media and Entertainment Pvt Ltd
 Galla Foods Pvt Ltd

Brands
 Amaron
 PowerZone
 Amaron Quanta
 Galla
 Silver Lining Storage Solutions

Awards 
Amara Raja Batteries Limited Won Innovative Product/Service (GPIPSA) 2020 award in Engineering sector for the innovation Motor Cycle Valve Regulated Lead Acid Battery punched grid with state of art manufacturing facility.

Philanthropy 
The Amara Raja Group has philanthropic operations focused on the upliftment of rural populations, and has committed itself to social activities in the areas of rural employment, learning & education, social rehabilitation, and rural upliftment. Specific schemes that benefit the local rural community include the supply and availability of safe drinking water by coordination and in participation with the rural community.

See also
 Exide Industries
 V-Guard Industries

References

External links

Indian companies established in 1985
Companies listed on the Bombay Stock Exchange
Amara Raja Group
1985 establishments in Andhra Pradesh
Companies listed on the National Stock Exchange of India